The ivory-backed woodswallow (Artamus monachus) is a species of bird in the family Artamidae. It is endemic to Sulawesi, Indonesia.

Its natural habitats are subtropical or tropical moist lowland forests and subtropical or tropical moist montane forests.

References

Artamus
Endemic birds of Sulawesi
Birds described in 1851
Taxa named by Charles Lucien Bonaparte
Taxonomy articles created by Polbot